Maud Bregeon (born 11 February 1991) is a French politician from En Marche. She has been the member of the National Assembly representing Hauts-de-Seine's 13th constituency since 2022.

Education 
Bregeon was born in Poitiers and graduated with an engineer's degree from École Polytechnique de l'Université de Nantes.

References

See also 

 List of deputies of the 16th National Assembly of France

1991 births
Living people
Deputies of the 16th National Assembly of the French Fifth Republic
21st-century French politicians
21st-century French women politicians
Women members of the National Assembly (France)
La République En Marche! politicians
People from Poitiers
Politicians from Nouvelle-Aquitaine
French women engineers